The 2020 CONMEBOL Pre-Olympic Tournament was an international association football tournament held in Colombia from 18 January to 9 February 2020. The ten national teams involved in the tournament were required to register a squad of 23 players; only players in these squads are eligible to take part in the tournament.

As the tournament will not held during the FIFA International Match Calendar, clubs were not obligated to release the players.

All registered players had to have been born on or after 1 January 1997. The age listed for each player is on 18 January 2020, the first day of the tournament. Players marked in bold have been capped at full International level.

On 10 January 2020, CONMEBOL published the lists of the ten teams.

Group A

Colombia 
Head coach: Arturo Reyes

The 23-man squad was announced on 27 December 2019. On 13 January 2020, midfielder Juan Pablo Ramírez was replaced by Johan Carbonero due to an injury.

Chile 
Head coach:  Bernardo Redín

The 23-man squad was announced on 27 December 2019.

Venezuela 
Head coach: Amleto Bonaccorso

The 23-man squad was announced on 31 December 2019. On 6 January 2020, Miguel Silva replaced goalkeeper Joel Graterol who was not released by his team América de Cali. On 16 January, Brayan Palmezano was replaced by Yeferson Soteldo due to an injury.

Ecuador 
Head coach:  Jorge Célico

The 23-man squad was announced on 23 December 2019. On 10 January 2020, Johan Mina replaced midfielder Jhojan Julio due to an injury. On 12 January, it was announced that the squad was reduced to 22 players because midfielder Jonathan Perlaza was not released by his new team Querétaro.

Argentina 
Head coach: Fernando Batista

The 22-man squad was announced on 15 December 2019. On 4 January 2020, a 23-man final squad was announced with some modifications. Facundo Mura was added to the squad whilst Lucas Robertone withdrew injured and was replaced by Gastón Togni, moreover, Maximiliano Centurión and Nazareno Colombo were called up to replace Leonel Mosevich and Lautaro Valenti who were not released by their teams Nacional and Lanús respectively. On 15 January, Carlos Valenzuela was replaced by Juan Brunetta due to an injury.

Group B

Brazil 
Head coach: André Jardine

The 23-man squad was announced on 16 December 2019. On 27 December, Douglas Luiz, Gabriel Martinelli, Emerson Royal, Gabriel Magalhães and Wendel were replaced by Douglas Augusto, Bruno Tabata, Dodô, Nino and Pepê respectively. Three other changes to the squad were announced on 3 January 2020, Douglas Augusto, Ayrton Lucas and Roger Ibañez were replaced by Maycon, Iago and Bruno Fuchs respectively. All these modifications were made because the replaced players were not allowed by their teams to take part in the tournament. On 16 January, Walce was replaced by Ricardo Graça due to an injury.

Paraguay 
Head coach:  Ernesto Marcucci

The 23-man squad was announced on 27 December 2019. On 3 January 2020, Sergio Bareiro was called up to replace Sebastián Ferreira who was not released by his team Monarcas Morelia.

Bolivia 
Head coach:  César Farías

The 23-man squad was announced on 7 January 2020.

Uruguay 
Head coach: Gustavo Ferreyra

The 23-man squad was announced on 29 December 2019. On 10 January 2020, defender Emiliano Ancheta was replaced by Jonathan González due to an injury.

Peru 
Head coach: Nolberto Solano

The 23-man squad was announced on 3 January 2020. On 15 January, Kluivert Aguilar was called up to replace Franco Medina who withdrew injured.

References

CONMEBOL Pre-Olympic Tournament